St. Sebastian is a painting of early Christian saint and martyr Saint Sebastian by the Italian High Renaissance artist Raphael, c. 1501–1502. Part of his early works, it is housed in the Accademia Carrara of Bergamo, Italy. In 2022 the painting was included in a exhibition held at the  National Gallery.

See also
List of paintings by Raphael

Notes

References

External links
 

Paintings by Raphael
1500s paintings
Collections of the Accademia Carrara
Raphael